Baz Qaleh-ye Malek (also Romanized as Bāz Qal‘eh-ye Malek and Bāz Qal‘eh-e Malek) is a village in Sangar Rural District, Sangar District, Rasht County, Gilan Province, Iran. At the 2006 census, its population was 489, in 155 families.

References 

Populated places in Rasht County